Summer Stephan is the District Attorney for the County of San Diego, serving in this capacity since 2017.

Summer Stephan was initially appointed to the position of District Attorney in 2017, to finish the term of resigning DA . Summer Stephan defeated challenger San Diego County Public Defender Geneviéve Jones-Wright, a Democrat, in the 2018 general election, with 63.7 percent of the vote. She is the second female district attorney for San Diego.

Early life 
Summer received her Bachelor of Arts degree from the University of California, Davis and her Juris Doctor from the University of the Pacific, McGeorge School of Law.

Career 
Stephen served as a Deputy District Attorney in San Diego County for 28 years, trying more than 100 jury cases. Stephan served as Chief of the District Attorney’s North County Branch as well as Chief of the Sex Crimes and Human Trafficking Division. From 2012-2017, she served as Chief Deputy District Attorney under her predecessor, Bonnie Dumanis, who upon her retirement appointed Stephen directly to her position as interim District Attorney in 2017.

2018 District Attorney race and allegations of anti-semitism 
In her successful campaign for District Attorney in 2018, Stephan's campaign created a website that accused Stephan's opponent of being supported by Jewish philanthropist George Soros.  When local San Diego media questioned Stephan about the alleged anti-semitic connotations of her attack website, Stephan walked away from reporters and had her security block them from asking her questions. It was widely publicized that George Soros Funded several DA's campaigns including Stephans opponent Genevieve Jones-Wright

Political affiliation 
A life-long Republican, DA Stephan joined some other local politicians in quitting the party in 2019. In an interview, Stephan said her decision to re-register to “no party preference” was a professional one and declined to give her views on the Republican Party or the president. “I don’t want to opine about politics because that’s exactly what I’m trying to get away from,” she said in an interview.

See also 
 List of district attorneys by county
 List of California district attorneys

References 

District attorneys in California
Lawyers from San Diego
Living people
University of California, Davis alumni
McGeorge School of Law alumni
Year of birth missing (living people)
California Republicans
California Independents